Player is the second album by French pop/R&B singer M. Pokora which was released on 26 January 2006 in France. The album debuted at #1 on the French charts in the first week.

Track listing

Alternate additions
 The first edition featured a limited edition calendar and the bonus track "Oh! (feat. Ciara)".
 The album was later re-released and included the bonus track "Celle" and "It's Alright", a duet with Ricky Martin.
 A few months later, the second edition of the album was re-released again with the previously released DVD "Un an avec M. Pokora" (A year with M. Pokora).

Charts

Weekly charts

Year-end charts

References

2006 albums
M. Pokora albums
crunk albums